The Institute for Workers' Control was founded in 1968 by Tony Topham and Ken Coates, the latter then a leader of the International Marxist Group and subsequently professor at the University of Nottingham and a member of the European Parliament from 1989 until 1999.

The Institute drew together shop stewards and militant workers to discuss workers' control of production. It grew out of the Workers' Control Conferences organised from 1964 by Voice of the Unions and the Centre for Socialist Education. From around 100 at the first meeting in Nottingham, the figure grew to some 1200 in 1969.

The Institute won sponsorship from a number of trade union leaders, including Hugh Scanlon. In the later opinion of the International Marxist Group's journal, the Institute over-accommodated to its sponsors and failed to organise its supporters: "only 26 people attended the AGM in 1970, and affiliation and membership fees have been maintained at a very high level."

External links
Coates and Topham Readings and Witnesses for Workers' Control
Socialist Renewal -- Institute for Workers' Control pamphlet series in PDF format

Organisations based in Nottingham
Politics of Nottingham
Political advocacy groups in the United Kingdom
University of Nottingham